Fernando Frederick Beretta (January 24, 1917 – November 17, 1962) was an American basketball player. He is best known for his All-American college career with Purdue University.

Beretta played at Bedford High School in Bedford, Indiana, then went to Purdue to play college basketball. At Purdue Beretta was a three-year letterman, a member of Pi Kappa Phi fraternity, and earned first-team All-Big Ten Conference and first-team All-American honors from the Helms Athletic Foundation as a senior in 1940. A guard, Beretta was known as a strong defender and ballhandler.

Beretta played for the Akron Firestone Non-Skids in the 1940–41 National Basketball League season, prior to joining the U.S. Army for World War II. Beretta would later be inducted into the Purdue athletic hall of fame and the Indiana Basketball Hall of Fame.

References

External links
NBL stats at basketball-reference.com
Indiana Basketball HOF profile

1917 births
1962 deaths
Akron Firestone Non-Skids players
All-American college men's basketball players
Basketball players from Indiana
Basketball players from Vermont
Guards (basketball)
People from Bedford, Indiana
Purdue Boilermakers men's basketball players
American men's basketball players